W.E. Hill (1887-1962) was an American cartoonist and illustrator active in the first half of the 20th-century. He is best known for his weekly full-page illustration series "Among Us Mortals" published in the New York Tribune from 1916 to 1922, and for creating the most popular iteration of the optical illusion My Wife and My Mother-in-Law (1915).

Biography 
William Hill was born in Binghamton, New York on January 19, 1887, to Marietta (Ely) and William Hill. Their only child, he would go on to graduate from Storm King School and Amherst College. While in school, he was inducted as a member of the Chi Phi Fraternity on October 24, 1905.

On June 11, 1918, Hill applied for a passport, stating his purpose was to "gather material for sketches." His employer at the time, the New York Tribune, sent him with a note on company letterhead that insisted Hill was a unique talent whom the paper desperately needed to send abroad to capture the American war effort. The passport office appears to have agreed as Hill was allowed to travel, eventually resulting in war-based pieces making up a large portion of his portfolio.

Hill was a signatory of The Greenwich Village Bookshop Door, a sort-of "who's who" of Greenwich Village's creative scene from 1921 to 1925. Rescued from the demolition of Floyd Dell's home in 1921, the bright red door found new life at a 4 Christopher Street bookshop (Frank Shay's Bookshop) where it was repainted and became a makeshift autograph book for the over 200 authors, artists, poets, and creatives who passed through the shop. Hill's signature can be found on the second panel of the front of the door, near the signatures of Alexander Popini, Hendrick Willem van Loon, Charles R. Macaulay, and Oscar Cesare. The Greenwich Village Bookshop Door is held by the Harry Ransom Center at the  University of Texas at Austin.

William Ely Hill died at Danbury Hospital in Danbury, Connecticut on December 9, 1962, at the age of 76. He is buried at Spring Forest Cemetery in his hometown of Binghamton, New York.

Career 
Best known for his satirical illustrations of everyday people, the preface to the 1917 collection of Hill's work said: 

Originally drawn for humor magazine Puck, Hill's illustration My Wife and My Mother-in-Law from 1915 remains an excellent example of an optically ambiguous image. When viewed from one angle you see a young woman wearing a necklace and facing away; from the other, an old woman in a veil, looking downward. Though he was inspired by an 1888 postcard and thus did not invent the design, Hill's version of the illustration is the one that became popular. Over a hundred years later, psychology textbooks still include his drawing and pop magazines use it for personality quizzes.

Puck Covers 
For the first half of the 1910s, W.E. Hill designed illustrations for the cover of Puck magazine, the American answer to Punch. A 1912 article from his hometown newspaper, The Bingamton Press, reported that London-based Vanity Fair had commented on Hill's talent for the covers in a then-recent publication.

Fitzgerald Dust Jackets 
Hill was responsible for the dust jacket illustrations on the first editions of F. Scott Fitzgerald's first three books: This Side of Paradise and Flappers and Philosophers in 1920 and The Beautiful and Damned two years later in 1922. Fitzgerald apparently did not like that Hill's designs were beginning to look like him and Zelda by the third book, so he asked his editor Maxwell Perkins to find someone new for the job.

Among Us Mortals

The Books 
In 1917, the Houghton Mifflin Company published a 150-page collection of illustrations by W. E. Hill with accompanying text by Franklin P. Adams titled "Among Us Mortals: Pictures and Legends by W. E. Hill." The book features 12 chapters that serve as organizational themes for collections of illustrations, titled in order: The Amateur Vaudeville, The Movies, The Burlesque Show, Afternoon Tea Hour, Modern Art, The Senior Hop, Summer People, War Stuff, The Apartment House, Opening Night, The Fraternity Banquet, and Christmas. Many illustrations initially published in the book would eventually be published in Hill's weekly illustration column. Following the success of his first book, Hill published "Among Us Cats" with Harper and Brothers on November 5, 1926. This book featured cat-focused cartoons, several in full color.

Weekly Series 
Hill began publishing satirical illustrations of everyday people in the New York Tribune on April 9, 1916, with his first small cartoon. Just a few weeks later on April 23 of that year, his work was picked up for a weekly series titled "Among Us Mortals" that ran until an abrupt end six years later on May 14, 1922. Highly successful at the time, the series has been largely forgotten in the decades since. Many Americans living abroad at the end of World War I treasured "Among Us Mortals" for how much it reminded them of home, with countless letters to the editor sent in thanks to the New York Tribune for running the collection.

Every Sunday, a full-page of Hill's themed illustrations was published in the New York Tribune and, after 1917, The Washington Times. Everyday themes of the week included The Medical Profession, Men's Business Lunch, The Intellectuals, The Soda Fountain, The Millinery Sale, The Suburban Station, and dozens more. Occasionally Hill published "Among Us Mortals" pages with more specific or entertainment-based themes, like The War Play, The Sudden Shower, The Poetry of Motion, By The Sad Sea Waves, The Amateur Vaudeville, The Ladies' Choral Club, and Between The Acts.

Dozens of "Among Us Mortals" spreads from both The Washington Times and the New York Tribune have been preserved by the Library of Congress's Chronicling America project for online viewing.

Burlesque Controversy 
On August 19, 1917, Hill found himself in a bit of a controversy after theming that week's illustrations on a local burlesque show. He was never known for drawing people in a dignified or elegant fashion, so it was perhaps understandable when the performers were offended by his portrayal of them as what they considered to be "disillusioned, vain and hollow." In response, the performers at nearby Gayety Theater took out a full page-ad in The Washington Times to share their thoughts on the publication and to invite Hill to experience real burlesque at one of their shows. The title asked Is Mr. Hill's Earning Capacity Equal to That of The Following Artists Who Have Climbed The Ladder of Success Through Burlesque? and was followed by 21 portraits of successful burlesque performers on star icons. It was signed by the theater's manager, Harry O. Jarboe.

Several interviews with local newspapers followed, where Hill largely laughed off the incident. It is unclear if he ever took the Gayety Theater up on their offer to visit and draw their performers, though he would publish several more burlesque pages once the controversy had settled.

Collections 
In addition to private collections, William Ely Hill's work is currently held in the collections of the Delaware Art Museum, the Billy Ireland Cartoon Library & Museum at Ohio State University, the University of Michigan, the University of Utah, and the Library of Congress.

References 

20th-century American artists
American cartoonists
1887 births
1962 deaths